Émeraude or emeraude is the French word for emerald and may refer to:

Emeraude Toubia, American actress
Emeraude (rocket), a French rocket system of the 1960s
French ship Émeraude, several French Naval ships
Piel Emeraude, French aircraft
Mitsubishi Emeraude, variant of the Mitsubishi Galant

Fictional characters
Emeraude, character in the Magic Knight Rayearth anime and manga series
Emeraude, character in the Tales of Graces action role-playing game

See also
Emerald (disambiguation)